Namgwangju station (means South Gwangju station) was a train station in Gyeongjeon Line, located in Gwangju, South Korea. The station was opened at December 25, 1930, as Singwangju station. Namgwangju station has successfully dispersed the passengers of Gwangju station, and grew as major station in Gwangju.

However, because Gyeongjeon line has moved outside of the city, Namgwangju station has closed, and moved the station function to Seogwangju station.

History 
 1930/12/25 : Opened as Singwangju station
 1938/04/01 : Changed name to Namgwangju station
 1978/11/20 : Cargo carrying stopped
 2000/08/10 : Station closed, moved the function to Seogwangju station.
 2007/02/27 : Tour train (2 cars) came to stop momentary.

Gallery

References 

Railway stations opened in 1930
Railway stations closed in 2000